
Year 803 (DCCCIII) was a common year starting on Sunday (link will display the full calendar) of the Julian calendar.

Events 
 By place 
 Byzantine Empire 
 Emperors Nikephoros I and Charlemagne settle their imperial boundaries in the Adriatic Sea, and sign the Pax Nicephori ("Peace of Nikephoros"). The Byzantines retain control of the coastal cities and islands in Dalmatian Croatia, while Frankish rule is accepted over Istria and the Dalmatian hinterland. Venice is recognized as independent by the Byzantine Empire.
 Summer – Bardanes Tourkos, Byzantine general (strategos), is proclaimed emperor by the troops of the Anatolic, Opsikion, Thracian and Bucellarian themes. The 'rebel' army marches to Chrysopolis, a suburb of Constantinople. After the defection of two of his trusted aids, future emperors Leo the Armenian and Michael the Amorian, Bardanes negotiates peace. 

 Europe 
 May – Krum, ruler (khan) of the Bulgarian Empire, begins his territorial expansion and raids the Byzantine northern frontier. He leads his warriors — mostly Bulgars, Slavs, Thracians and  Macedonians — across the Carpathian Mountains, over the Danube River, and throughout Transylvania, Thrace, and Macedonia.
 St. Peter Stiftskulinarium, possibly Central Europe's oldest restaurant, is founded in Salzburg, Austria.

 Abbasid Caliphate 
 Caliph Harun al-Rashid has his friend and vizier (secretary) Ja'far ibn Yahya beheaded, The surviving members of the influential Barmakid family (Jafar's family) are imprisoned on the orders of Harun, and their property is confiscated.
 Marriage of caliph Harun al-Rashid and Umm Muhammad; She was the daughter of Abbasid prince Salih al-Miskin and Umm Abdullah, the daughter of Isa ibn Ali. They married in November-December 803 in Al-Raqqah. She had been formerly been married to Ibrahim ibn al-Mahdi, who had repudiated her.
 The 803 Mopsuestia earthquake takes place in the vicinity of Mopsuestia, and the Gulf of Alexandretta (İskenderun) 

 By topic 
 Religion 
 October 12 – The Synod of Clofesho (possibly Brixworth) is held, at which the Archbishopric of Lichfield is demoted to an ordinary bishopric, with papal permission obtained by King Coenwulf of Mercia.

Births 
 Du Mu, Chinese poet and official (d. 852)
 Emma of Altdorf, Frankish queen and wife of King Louis the German of East Francia (died 876)
 Ibn 'Abd al-Hakam, Muslim historian (d. 871)
 Liu Congjian, Chinese governor (d. 843)

Deaths 
 May 25 – Higbald, bishop of Lindisfarne
 August 9 – Irene of Athens, Byzantine empress
 Ja'far ibn Yahya, Persian vizier (b. 767)
 Kardam, ruler (khan) of Bulgaria (or 802)

References

Sources